The 1959 Delaware Fightin' Blue Hens football team was an American football team that represented the University of Delaware in the Middle Atlantic Conference during the 1959 NCAA College Division football season. In its ninth season under head coach David M. Nelson, the team compiled an 8–1 record (5–0 against MAC opponents) and outscored opponents by a total of 286 to 95. Mark Hurm was the team captain. 

The Blue Hens started the year unranked, but early victories over Lafayette, Lehigh and Massachusetts catapulted them into the UPI Small College Poll's national top 3 by mid-October. Delaware held the No. 1 spot for two weeks in November before ceding it to Bowling Green in a head-to-head matchup. Delaware dropped to No. 4, and remained at that rank through the end of the season.

The team played its home games at Delaware Stadium in Newark, Delaware.

Schedule

References

Delaware
Delaware Fightin' Blue Hens football seasons
Delaware Fightin' Blue Hens football